Gliophorus pseudograminicolor is a species of agaric fungus in the family Hygrophoraceae. Found in Australia, it was originally described in 1997 by mycologist Anthony M. Young as a species of Hygrocybe and transferred to Gliophorus in 2013.

References

External links

Hygrophoraceae
Fungi described in 1997
Fungi of Australia